The Coronation of Ardashir II is a rock relief that was carved between 379 and 383 by Ardashir II, the eleventh king of kings (shahanshah) of the Sasanian Empire. The rock relief is located in Taq-e Bostan in Iran. 

The relief shows three standing figures wearing regalia; Ardashir being in the middle, flanked by two male figures. The figure to the right, who is giving the diadem to Ardashir originally used to recognized as the Zoroastrian supreme god Ahura Mazda, but is now agreed to be Shapur II due to the style of his crown, and which also fits well due to Shapur being the one designating Ardashir as shah to begin with. The two shahs are standing on the body of a fallen enemy, unmistakably a Roman, whose crown indicates that he is an emperor. The fallen figure is most likely supposed to represent the Roman emperor Julian, who invaded Iran in 363 and was killed west of the Sasanian capital of Ctesiphon. The figure standing to the far left, perceived by some to be the Zoroastrian prophet Zoroaster, is most likely the angelic divinity Mithra. He is holding a raised barsom, thus sanctifying the investiture.

Gallery

References

Sources 
 
 

Sasanian inscriptions
4th-century inscriptions
Archaeological sites in Iran
Tourist attractions in Kermanshah Province
Rock reliefs in Iran
Cultural depictions of Julian (emperor)